Hourtin is a commune of southwestern France, located in the Gironde department, administrative region of Nouvelle-Aquitaine (before 2015: Aquitaine). It is located in the canton Le Sud-Médoc, part of the district of Lesparre-Médoc. It is a member of the Community of Communes of Médoc Atlantique.

Population

Geography 

Hourtin is on the Côte d'Argent in the Medoc peninsula, at 25 km (15.5 mi) from Pauillac to the east, 45 km (28 mi) from the Pointe de Grave to the north, and 60 km (37.2 mi) from Bordeaux to the south east.

The town is divided into three main neighbourhoods (Hourtin-Ville, Hourtin-Port, Hourtin-Plage) located several kilometres from one another.

Hourtin-Ville is centred around a large square with a grassy area, church and some basic facilities.

Hourtin-Plage is the ocean-facing part of the town, about 12 kilometres from Hourtin-Ville, with a large sandy beach that stretches for several kilometres from north to south. This beach is easily accessible by a trail laid on top of the dune. There are also several accesses south and north but they are only accessible by bicycle via the cycle track. Ample parking is available with a few shops and facilities for tourists and visitors. Many of these facilities are seasonal.

Hourtin-Port is on the Lac d'Hourtin et de Carcans, one of the great lakes of the Landes. As well as port and boating facilities, many activities are planned for the children with a play park, a mini golf course and the children's island which is a large playground for the younger ones. The lake extends 18 km (11.2 mi) at its longest and 5 km (3.1 mi) at its widest, parallel to the Côte d'Argent on the Atlantic Ocean. It is the second largest natural freshwater lake in France after Lake Geneva. It lies at an elevation of 14 m (46 ft), and has a surface area of 56.67 km² (21.88 sq. miles). The lake has several sandy beaches left to the port and in Piqueyrot. It is shared with the city of Carcans.

Nature reserve 

The 21.5 km² (8.3 sq. miles) area of dunes and marshland between the north-western shore of the lake and the Atlantic Ocean, known as the dunes et marais d'Hourtin, has been designated a nature reserve since 2009.

Twin towns 
Pontarddulais, Swansea, Wales

See also
 Communes of the Gironde department

References

External links

Official site
Official website of the tourist office Médoc Océan

Communes of Gironde